Goldene Aue is a Verbandsgemeinde ("collective municipality") in the Mansfeld-Südharz district, in Saxony-Anhalt, Germany. Before 1 January 2010, it was a Verwaltungsgemeinschaft. It is situated south and west of Sangerhausen. It is named after the Goldene Aue valley. The seat of the Verbandsgemeinde is in Kelbra.

The Verbandsgemeinde Goldene Aue consists of the following municipalities:

 Berga 
 Brücken-Hackpfüffel 
 Edersleben 
 Kelbra
 Wallhausen

References

Verbandsgemeinden in Saxony-Anhalt